Cassius F. Butts (born July 10, 1971) is an American business executive and former Region IV Administrator for the United States Small Business Administration (SBA) appointed by President Barack Obama.

Professional
Cassius has worked alongside domestic and international heads of state, presidents and CEOs. He understands the importance of creating pipeline opportunities for aspiring professionals and enjoys mentoring and advising mid-career professionals.  Cassius serves on the WellStar Health System Institutional Review Board, the National Black MBA Association, the Florida 8a Association a nd is a member of the World Affairs Council of Atlanta. 

In 2020, Cassius was appointed to serve on the Georgia Economic Development Board, National Black MBA Association. He also was appointed to serve as chairman of the Fort McPherson Local Redevelopment Authority t he previous year. In 2019, he was invited to serve on the Morehouse College  Georgia Department of Business & Economics Board of Advisors. Cassius thrives on sharing his experience and knowledge to help others succeed with determination, transparency, and integrity.

Cassius is a proud descendant of an entrepreneurial, higher education, and faith-driven family.  Following his family values and career, he previously served as an Executive In Residence at the Robinson College of Business within Georgia State University. His contributions helped the College receive the national ranking of the "Second Most Innovative University" by U.S. News & World Report in 2018. 

The former regional administrator for the United States Small Business Administration (SBA) was appointed by President Barack Obama in 2011. During his tenure with SBA, he managed five record-breaking years for SBA lending within the eight southern states. He developed a strategy that helped achieve over $30 billion to small businesses during his appointment. 

Cassius also served as a Presidential Management Fellow under the George W. Bush Administration within the United States Department of Housing & Urban Development (HUD). He assisted in the establishment of HUD’s multi-million marketing procurement process and was named Branch Chief of the Real Estate Owned division during his tenure.

Cassius is the president & CEO of 1st Choice Credit Union headquartered in Atlanta, GA. 1st Choice is a certified CDFI that serves over 9,000 members with 200 shared locations. 

He is also the founder of Capital Fortitude Business Advisors; a boutique management-consulting firm that helps small businesses, NGO's and higher educational entities achieve their bottom line.  His firm is also a partner with American Express's "Summit for Success" which provides growth strategies for small to midsize businesses. 

In 2019, Capital Fortitude Business Advisors was identified to lead the task force on minority & small businesses via the Georgians First Commission. He also was appointed to serve as a Consumer Advocate for the Georgia Board of Cemeterians. 

In addition, Cassius served on transition team for Atlanta Mayor Keisha Lance Bottoms along with other executives and CEO's such as Delta Airlines, UPS, NYSE to name a few.
www.cassiusbutts.com
Cassius has deep rooted interests in adding value to society and various state of affairs. He co-founded,  STRATACHIEVE  -  a social enterprise of like-minded change professionals organized to help solve the challenges of today and tomorrow.

Early life
He was born in Philadelphia, PA and raised in Orlando, FL as the son of a late aerospace engineer and his mother, the owner and operator of a National Association of Family Child Care business. Growing up he and his only brother embarked on various business ventures and creative pursuits throughout their childhood. For the past 20 years, he has worked with many elected and appointed officials.

Education

Affiliations
A graduate of the Atlanta Regional Commission’s Regional Leadership Institute, former South Cobb Economic Development Advisory Council, former Federal Executive Board Committee member and Leadership Atlanta of 2012. He is a member of Sigma Pi Phi, Fraternity-Kappa Boulé chapter, Kappa Alpha Psi, fraternity., the 100 Black Men of Atlanta and H.R. Butler Masonic Lodge #23
https://envolveglobal.org/champions/cassius-f-butts/

References

1971 births
Living people
Administrators of the Small Business Administration
Morehouse College alumni
Clark Atlanta University alumni
Emory University alumni
Businesspeople from Philadelphia